Bruno Leonardo Barbosa (born March 2, 1982 in Surubim-PE), known as Bruno Recife or simply Bruno, is a Brazilian football left back. He currently plays for Mirassol.

Honours
Pernambuco State League: 2006, 2007

Contract
2 January 2007 to 31 December 2009

External links

1982 births
Living people
Brazilian footballers
Associação Atlética Ponte Preta players
Sport Club do Recife players
Associação Desportiva São Caetano players
Guarani FC players
Mirassol Futebol Clube players
Association football defenders